Fredy Agustín Vera Fernández (born 15 January 1986 in Asunción, Paraguay) is a Paraguayan football defender, who plays for Club Sol de América.

Vera began playing for the Libertad reserves before being signed by Rubio Ñú in 2009. He joined Greek side Iraklis on loan in February 2010.

References

External links
 BDFA profile

1986 births
Living people
Paraguayan footballers
Club Tacuary footballers
Sport Colombia footballers
Association football defenders
Iraklis Thessaloniki F.C. players
Paraguayan expatriate footballers
Expatriate footballers in Greece